Eugen Pâslaru was a Moldovan politician.

Biography 

Eugen Pâslaru was born on 30 December 1950 in Costiceni, a village in the commune of Chernivtsi Oblast (province) in the western Ukraine. He served as member of the first Parliament of Moldova and in 1991, was a signatory to the Declaration of Independence of the Republic of Moldova. He is also the founder of Sălcuța winery. He served in the Transnistria war which occurred between 2 March – 21 July 1992. He was president of the Căușeni district.

References

External links 
 Cine au fost şi ce fac deputaţii primului Parlament din R. Moldova (1990-1994)?
 Declaraţia deputaţilor din primul Parlament
 Site-ul Parlamentului Republicii Moldova

2018 deaths
Moldovan MPs 1990–1994
Popular Front of Moldova MPs
1950 births